Krivosheyev (from кривая шея meaning crooked neck) is a Russian masculine surname, its feminine counterpart is Krivosheyeva. It may refer to
Grigori F. Krivosheev (1929–2019), Russian military historian
Olga Krivosheyeva (born 1961), Soviet volleyball player

Russian-language surnames